Winifred Una Margaretta George (19 January 1914 – 19 March 1988) was an Australian cricket player. George played three tests for the Australia national women's cricket team. George was born in Mordialloc, Victoria, and was the sixteenth woman to play Women's Test cricket for Australia. She died in Dandenong, Victoria.

References

1914 births
1988 deaths
Australia women Test cricketers
Wicket-keepers
Cricketers from Melbourne
People from Mordialloc, Victoria